In mathematics, the Denjoy–Young–Saks theorem gives some possibilities for  the Dini derivatives of a function that hold almost everywhere.
 proved the theorem for continuous functions,  extended it to measurable functions, and  extended it to arbitrary functions.
 and  give historical accounts of the theorem.

Statement

If f is a real valued function defined on an interval, then with the possible exception of a set of measure 0 on the interval, the Dini derivatives of f satisfy one of the following four conditions at each point:

f has a finite derivative
D+f = D–f is finite, D−f = ∞, D+f = –∞.
D−f = D+f is finite, D+f = ∞, D–f = –∞.
D−f = D+f = ∞, D–f = D+f = –∞.

References

Theorems in analysis